A Cooperstown cocktail is a cocktail containing gin, dry vermouth, and sweet vermouth. It is shaken with ice and strained into a chilled cocktail glass with a sprig of mint added.

History
The Cooperstown cocktail originated at the Waldorf bar around the turn of the 20th century. It was named in honor of Craig Wadsworth and his friends, who lived in Cooperstown, New York.

See also
 List of cocktails

References

Cocktails with gin